Bryce Robinson (born November 13, 1993) is an American sprinter. He competed collegiately for the University of Tulsa. He won a bronze medal in the 4×100 m relay at the 2019 Pan American Games.

Personal bests
Outdoor
100 m: 9.99 (Storrs, Connecticut 2015)
200 m: 20.30 (Lubbock, Texas 2015)
300 m: 32.76 (Philadelphia 2022)
400 m: 45.62 (Fayetteville, Arkansas 2022)
Indoor
60 m: 6.51 (Albuquerque 2018)
200 m: 20.63 (Lincoln, Nebraska 2016)
300 m: 34.01 (Ostrava 2019)
400 m: 46.75 (New York City 2015)

References

External links
 

1993 births
Living people
People from Edmond, Oklahoma
Sportspeople from Oklahoma City
American male sprinters
Tulsa Golden Hurricane men's track and field athletes
Track and field athletes from Oklahoma
Pan American Games medalists in athletics (track and field)
Pan American Games bronze medalists for the United States
Athletes (track and field) at the 2019 Pan American Games
Medalists at the 2019 Pan American Games
Universiade medalists in athletics (track and field)
Medalists at the 2015 Summer Universiade
Universiade silver medalists for the United States